Medical gas supply systems in hospitals and other healthcare facilities are utilized to supply specialized gases and gas mixtures to various parts of the facility. Products handled by such systems typically include:

Oxygen
Medical air
Nitrous oxide
Nitrogen
Carbon dioxide
Medical vacuum
Waste anaesthetic gas disposal (US) or anaesthetic gas scavenging system (ISO)

Source equipment systems are generally required to be monitored by alarm systems at the point of supply for abnormal (high or low) gas pressure in areas such as general ward, operating theatres, intensive care units, recovery rooms, or major treatment rooms. Equipment is connected to the medical gas pipeline system via station outlets (US) or terminal units (ISO). 

Medical gas systems are commonly color coded to identify their contents, but as coding systems and requirements (such as those for bottled gas) vary by jurisdiction, the text or labeling is the most reliable guide to the contents. Emergency shut-off valves, or zone valves, are often installed in order to stop gas flowing to an area in the event of fire or substantial leak, as well as for service. Valves may be positioned at the entrance to departments, with access provided via emergency pull-out windows.

Oxygen

Oxygen may be used for patients requiring supplemental oxygen via mask. This arrangement is described as a vacuum insulated evaporator or bulk tank. In small medical centers with a low patient capacity, oxygen is usually supplied by a manifold of multiple high-pressure cylinders. In areas where a bulk system or high-pressure cylinder manifold is not suitable, oxygen may be supplied by an oxygen concentrator. However, on site production of oxygen is still a relatively new technology.

Medical air
Medical air is compressed air supplied by a special air compressor, through a dryer (in order to maintain correct dew point levels), and distributed to patient care areas by half hard BS:EN 13348 copper pipe and also use isolation ball valve for operating the services of compressed air 4 bar. It is also called medical air 4 bar. In smaller facilities, medical air may also be supplied via high-pressure cylinders. If not used correctly it can be harmful to humans.

Nitrous oxide
Nitrous oxide is supplied to various surgical suites for its anaesthetic functions during preoperative procedures. It is delivered to the hospital in high-pressure cylinders and supplied through the Medical Gas system. Some bulk systems exist, but are no longer installed due to environmental concerns and overall reduced consumption of nitrous oxide.

Nitrogen
Nitrogen is typically used to power pneumatic surgical equipment during various procedures, and is supplied by high-pressure cylinders.

Instrument air/surgical air
Like nitrogen, instrument air is used to power surgical equipment. However, it is generated on site by an air compressor (similar to a medical air compressor) rather than high-pressure cylinders. Early air compressors could not offer the purity required to drive surgical equipment. However, this has changed and instrument air is becoming a popular alternative to nitrogen.

Carbon dioxide
Typically used for insufflation during surgery, and also used in laser surgeries. It is also used for certain respiratory disorders. It contains 5 percent.

Medical vacuum
Medical vacuum in a hospital supports suction equipment and evacuation procedures, supplied by vacuum pump systems exhausting to the atmosphere.

Waste anaesthetic gas disposal/anaesthetic gas scavenging system 
Waste anaesthetic gas disposal, or anaesthetic gas scavenging system, is used in hospital anaesthesia evacuation procedures. Although it is similar to a medical vacuum system, some building codes require anaesthetic gases to be scavenged separately.

Medical gas mixtures
There are many gas mixtures used for clinical and medical applications. They are often used for patient diagnostics such as lung function testing or blood gas analysis. Test gases are also used to calibrate and maintain medical devices used for the delivery of anaesthetic gases. In laboratories, culture growth applications include controlled aerobic or anaerobic incubator atmospheres for biological cell culture or tissue growth. Controlled aerobic conditions are created using mixtures rich in oxygen and anaerobic conditions are created using mixtures rich in hydrogen or carbon dioxide.

Two common medical gas mixtures are entonox and heliox.

References

External links
British Compressed Gases Association website: Department of Health (United Kingdom) HTM02-01 Medical Gas Pipeline Systems Part A: Design, installation, validation and verification

British Compressed Gases Association website: Department of Health (United Kingdom) HTM02-01 Medical Gas Pipeline Systems Part B: Operational Management

Medical equipment
Industrial gases